This is a list of schools on the Isle of Wight, England.

State-funded schools

Primary schools

There are currently 39 state-maintained primary schools on the Isle of Wight, after Chale Primary School closed in July 2011 following the schools reorganisation - it had a roll of only 20 pupils. Merges also meant that the number of primary schools on the island decreased: St Wilfrids Catholic Primary, St Boniface C of E Primary and St Margarets C of E Primary (all in Ventnor) all closed and reopened as St Francis Catholic and Church of England Primary School on the site of the old Ventnor Middle School in a purpose built, brand new building; St John's C of E Primary (Sandown) and Sandown C of E Primary School merged to become The Bay C of E Primary School, split across both of the former school sites; and East Cowes Primary School and Whippingham Primary School merged to become Queensgate Foundation Primary School on the old Osborne Middle School site. A number of other primary schools also moved to former middle school sites including Gurnard Primary School to the old Solent Middle School site in Cowes, Hunnyhill Primary School to the old Kitbridge Middle School site in Newport, Greenmount Primary to the old Mayfield Middle School site in Ryde, Oakfield C of E Primary School to the old Bishop Lovett Middle School site in Ryde, Bembridge Primary School to the old Forelands Middle School site in Bembridge and Broadlea Primary School to the old Lake Middle School site in Lake. In addition, Haylands Primary School has had a brand new school built on the playing fields of the former Swanmore Middle School in Ryde.

Secondary schools

There are currently seven island secondary schools, five of which also have a sixth form. The sixth forms for Carisbrooke College and Medina College are merged, and are based at the new Island Innovation VI Form Campus, on the site of the former Nodehill Middle School in the centre of Newport. The Island Free School and The Bay Church of England School do not operate a sixth form.

Special and alternative schools
State-maintained special schools on the Isle of Wight include:
 Island Learning Centre (Pupil Referral Unit)
 Medina House School 
 St George's School

Further and higher education
Isle of Wight College acts as the main provider of vocational further education on the island, as well as offers higher education through University Centre Isle of Wight.

Independent schools

Senior and alternative schools
 Priory School
 Ryde School with Upper Chine

Special and alternative schools
 OEA Education
 St Catherines School

Former schools

Primary schools
Weston Academy closed in 2015.

Middle schools
Previous middle schools below have now been phased out during the transition to a two-tier education system. Education on the Island has really suffered since this happened and most of the secondary schools are now deemed unsatisfactory or have gone into special measures.

There were originally 16 state-maintained middle schools on the Isle of Wight, including two voluntary aided church schools (which were the foundation for the new Christ the King College) and two controlled church schools. In July 2008, the two voluntary aided middle schools (Archbishop King Catholic Middle School and Trinity Church of England Middle School), which are both located on Wellington Road in Carisbrooke, closed and reopened in September of the same year as Christ the King College, and from September 2009, kept on its Year 8 pupils of the previous academic year as Year 9 pupils and started the transition from middle school to secondary school age range. In line with the rest of the Island, September 2009 was the last year in which a Year 5 was admitted to the Christ the King College. Instead, all Year 5 pupils, and then consequently Year 6 pupils, on the island remained in primary schools from September 2010 onwards. 
Additionally, Kitbridge Middle School became federated with Downside Middle School, and the two schools both became Downside Middle School, but were split across the two separate campuses in Newport; Furrlongs Campus and Kitbridge Campus.

All middle schools on the island, other than Christ The King College, closed for pupils as of 21 July 2011. Instead of the four years at middle school, children have been given 2 extra years in primary school and then move straight onto secondary school. Children already in middle school transferred straight to the new secondary schools at the start of the next academic year, whether they are in year 6, 7 or 8.

Secondary schools
Sandown Bay Academy (formerly Sandown High School) closed in 2018. Isle of Wight Studio School closed a year later.

Independent schools
Bembridge School was in operation on the island from 1919 to 1997.

See also
 Education on the Isle of Wight
 Education in England
 List of schools in the South East of England

References

External links

 EduWight - Schools on the Isle of Wight

Schools on the Isle of Wight
Isle of Wight
Lists of buildings and structures on the Isle of Wight